Hugo Arndt Rodolf, Baron van Lawick (10 April 1937 – 2 June 2002) was a Dutch wildlife filmmaker and photographer.

Through his still photographs and films, Van Lawick helped popularize the study of chimpanzees during his wife Jane Goodall's studies at Gombe Stream National Park during the 1960s and 1970s.  His films drew the attention of the viewing public to the dramatic life cycles of several wild animals of the Serengeti, such as wild dogs, elephants, and lions.

Early life
He was born in Surabaya, Dutch East Indies (now Indonesia) as the son of Baron Hugo Anne Victor Raoul van Lawick (11 August 1909 – 17 June 1941) and Isabella Sophia van Ittersum (11 February 1913 – 30 December 1977). His father was a pilot with the Dutch fleet, and upon his death while in service the Baroness moved Hugo and his brother first to Australia, then to England, where they lived successively, in London, Hull, and Devon.  In the latter, Hugo was enrolled in boarding school, where he remained after his mother and brother moved to the Netherlands shortly after the end of World War II.  In 1947, he joined them in Amersfoort.

Photographer
In November 1959, Hugo went to Africa to pursue his passion of photographing and taking footage of wild animals, finding employment as a cameraman for a filmmaking couple.  After a film he produced as the background to a lecture given by Louis Leakey was seen by a staff member at National Geographic, he was given a retainer for future work for the magazine.

On the recommendation of Leakey, in August 1962 he began photographing and filming chimpanzees of the Kasakela chimpanzee community at Gombe Stream National Park where Jane Goodall, Leakey's protégée, had been researching chimpanzees since July 1960. They married on 28 March 1964 in Chelsea Old Church, London and lived in Tanzania for many years, both at Gombe and elsewhere on other research projects. In 1967 they had a son Hugo Eric Louis, affectionately known as "Grub". They were divorced in 1974 but remained friends.  On 23 March 1978, in Banjul, Gambia, Hugo married Theresa Rice. They were divorced 19 January 1984.

Through Hugo's film People of the Forest the world came to know members of Gombe's "F" family, namely Flo, Fifi, and Flint, in addition to a number of their other immediate relations. By the time he stopped filming at Gombe, he had created a visual record spanning over twenty years and documenting the lives of three generations of chimpanzees. Hugo made a number of wildlife documentaries for television, but also made several films for theatrical release on 35 mm film, such as The Leopard Son (1996) and Serengeti Symphony, both produced by Nature Conservation Films WW. Besides making films himself, Hugo was an important influence and mentor to a younger generation of wildlife filmmakers. His tented camp, Ndutu, in the Serengeti, became through his guidance a breeding ground for new wildlife film-makers.

Death and honors
In 1998, Hugo was forced to retire due to emphysema. He left Ndutu to live with his son, "Grub" in Dar es Salaam, Tanzania, where he died at the age of 65. On 7 June, during a ceremony attended by family, friends, staff and government officials, Hugo was buried at the place his tent had stood for over 30 years in his camp in the Serengeti.

Hugo van Lawick won eight Emmy awards for his films, including the Primetime Emmy Award for Outstanding Cinematography for a Nonfiction Program sixteen years after his death for previously unreleased photography.  He was appointed officer in the Order of the Golden Ark in 1992 by Prince Bernhard of the Netherlands, the co-founder of the WWF.

Publications 
with Peter Matthiessen: Sand Rivers, Aurum Press, London 1981, .
Savage Paradise – The Predators of Serengeti, Collins, St James Place, London 1977. .

References
 Dale Peterson, (2006) Jane Goodall: The Woman Who Redefined Man, pgs. 299–301.

External links
 Official website
 
 Tanzania Safari Channel (archived)
 Nature Conservation Films WW (archived)

1937 births
2002 deaths
Barons of the Netherlands
Dutch photographers
Nature photographers
Dutch documentary filmmakers
Emmy Award winners
Primetime Emmy Award winners
Jane Goodall
People from Surabaya
20th-century Dutch zoologists